Francis Campaner (born 1 February 1946 in Saint-Germain-de-la-Rivière) is a French former professional road bicycle racer.

Major results

1967
Aigueperse
Allassac
Bannalec
Beaulac-Bernos
La Couronne
Laguirande
GP de Fréjus
1968
Lubersac
1969
Castillones
Mont-de-Marsan
Sizun
GP Petit Varois
Saint-Médard de Guizières
1972
La Bastide d'Armagnac
1974
Saussignac
Tour de France:
Winner stage 19A
1975
Tour du Limousin
Ambarès
1978
Pléaux

External links 

Official Tour de France results for Francis Campaner

French male cyclists
1946 births
Living people
French Tour de France stage winners
Sportspeople from Gironde
Cyclists from Nouvelle-Aquitaine